Castlereagh Highway is a  state highway located in New South Wales and Queensland, Australia. From north to south the highway traverses South West Queensland and the North West Slopes, Orana, and Central West regions of New South Wales.

The highway is part of the Great Inland Way linking Sydney and Cairns, and provides all-weather access to rugged black opal country of Lightning Ridge.

Castlereagh Highway was named after the Castlereagh River, which it parallels for most of its journey north from Gilgandra.

Route
Continuing south through Coonamble, the highway crosses the Castlereagh River and meets the Oxley and Newell Highways in Gilgandra.

History
The passing of the Main Roads Act of 1924 through the Parliament of New South Wales provided for the declaration of Main Roads, roads partially funded by the State government through the Main Roads Board (later the Department of Main Roads, and eventually Transport for NSW). Main Road No. 55 was declared from the intersection with Great Western Highway near Marrangaroo, via Ilford, Mudgee, and Gulgong to Craboon (and continuing northwards via Coolah eventually to the intersection with Oxley Highway at Mullaley), Main Road No. 56 was declared from Walgett, via Coonamble to Gilgandra (and continuing southwards via Dubbo, Forbes, Cowra, Yass and Canberra eventually to the intersection with Queanbeyan-Braidwood Road, today Kings Highway, at Queanbeyan), and Main Road No. 205 was declared from Craboon via Dunedoo to Mendooran (and continuing northwards via Tooraweenah to Coonamble), on the same day, 8 August 1928. With the passing of the Main Roads (Amendment) Act of 1929 to provide for additional declarations of State Highways and Trunk Roads, these were amended to Trunk Roads 55 and 56 and Main Road 205 on 8 April 1929. Trunk Road 77 was later declared from the intersection with Oxley Highway at Gilgandra via Mendooran and Dunedoo, to Trunk Road 55 at Craboon, on 16 March 1938.

The Department of Main Roads, which had succeeded the New South Wales MRB in 1932, declared State Highway 18 on 16 March 1938, from the intersection with State Highway 11 (later known as Oxley Highway) at Gilgandra via Coonamble and Walgett to the state border with Queensland near Brenda; with the declaration of State Highway 17 (later known as Newell Highway) on the same day, the northern end of Trunk Road 56 was truncated to meet State Highway 17 at Forbes, as a result. State Highway 18 was named Castlereagh Highway on 12 May 1954, after the Castlereagh River, with the river named in honour of Lord Castlereagh.

The alignment north of Lightning Ridge was altered on 17 June 1959 to meet the state border with Queensland at Hebel via Angledool, instead of via Brenda. In December 1982, a 15 kilometre deviation opened south of Mudgee as part of the Windamere Dam project.

The Roads and Traffic Authority, succeeding the New South Wales DMR in 1989, extended the highway declaration south from Gilgandra via Dunedoo and Mudgee to Marrangaroo on 3 October 1997, subsuming Main Road 77 (previously Trunk Road 77). The southern end of Main Road 56 (previously Trunk Road 56) was truncated to meet State Highway 18 east of Craboon, as a result.

The passing of the Roads Act of 1993 through the Parliament of New South Wales updated road classifications and the way they could be declared within New South Wales. Under this act, Castlereagh Highway today retains its declaration as Highway 18, from the state border with Queensland at Hebel to the intersection with Oxley Highway in Gilgrandra, then from the intersection with Newell Highway in Gilgandra to the intersection with Golden Highway in Dunedoo, then from the intersection with Golden Highway near Craboon to the interchange with Great Western Highway at Marrangaroo.

Within New South Wales, the highway was signed National Route 55 in 1974 from Gilgandra to Walgett, and State Route 86 south of Gilgandra; National Route 55 was extended north from Walgett to the border with Queensland in 1983. The Queensland Road Department changed this in 1997 and signed National Route 55 over the border north to St George, and eventually to Charters Towers in later years. With both states' conversion to the newer alphanumeric system between 2005 and 2013, its route number was updated to route A7 between Rolleston and Roma and A55 between Roma and the state border for the highway within Queensland in 2005, and eventually along the remaining highway within New South Wales as route B55 in 2013.

Upgrades
The Roads of Strategic Importance initiative, last updated in March 2022, includes the following project for Castlereagh Highway.

Carnarvon Highway intersection upgrade
A project to upgrade the intersection with Carnarvon Highway at a cost of $3.4 million was completed in mid-2022. This project was targeted for "early works" by the Queensland Government.

Major junctions

See also

 Highways in Australia
 List of highways in New South Wales
 List of highways in Queensland

References

Highways in New South Wales
Highways in Queensland